Petra Cecilia Alexandra Hultgren (born 21 April 1972, in Värmdö, Stockholm County) is a Swedish actress.

She was crowned as Miss Sweden in 1995 and won the Miss Photogenic award at Miss Universe 1995.

Hultgren currently stars in the Swedish series Andra Avenyn. She is known now as Petra van de Voort.

Series
 1996 - Vänner och fiender Friends and enemies
 1998 - Vita lögner White lies
 2006 - Mäklarna The Agents
 2008 - Andra Avenyn Second Avenue

Appearances in films
 2001 - No joke city
 2002 - Blueprint
 2004 - Det nya livet The new life
 2004 - Skyddsängeln The Guardian
 2004 - Is this love?
 2005 - Wallander: Afrikanen Wallander: The African
 2006 - Att göra en pudel To make a poodle
 2009 - SOKO Wismar : Das dritte Feuer

References

External links

Interview with Petra van de Voort at Eurochannel

1972 births
Living people
Miss Sweden winners
Miss Universe 1995 contestants
People from Värmdö Municipality